Sara Berner (born Lillian Ann Herdan; January 12, 1912 – December 19, 1969) was an American actress. Known for her expertise in dialect and characterization, she began her career as a performer in vaudeville before becoming a voice actress for radio and animated shorts. She starred in her own radio show on NBC, Sara's Private Caper, and was best known as telephone operator Mabel Flapsaddle on The Jack Benny Program.

Columnist Erskine Johnson described Berner in 1944 as "the most famous voice in Hollywood."

Early life and career
Born Lillian Ann Herdan in 1912 in Albany, New York, she adopted her stage name by combining her mother's first name (Sarah) and her maiden name of Berner. She was the oldest of four children, and her family relocated to Tulsa, Oklahoma when she was a teenager. She became interested in performing after watching silent movies and vaudeville shows at a theater and then imitating scenes in front of the women's restroom attendant.

Berner performed in an adaptation of Abie's Irish Rose after graduation, and she studied drama for two years at the University of Tulsa. She and her family then moved to Philadelphia, Pennsylvania, where she worked in a Wanamaker's department store until she was fired for mimicking a customer. Berner hosted her own fifteen-minute program (written by Arthur Q. Bryan) thereafter on a local radio station, then returned to New York City in hopes of pursuing a show-business career. She worked in a Broadway millinery in the meantime, and studied dialect by observing customers' Brooklyn accents. She sneaked out during a shift to audition for Major Edward Bowes' amateur hour, and was hired the next day. Beginning in 1937, Berner toured the country as part of Bowes' sixteen-member "all-girl unit" of vaudeville acts over the next four years, and created a gimmick of a fired saleslady who performed imitations of celebrities such as Mae West and Katharine Hepburn.

Career

Radio
After the Major Bowes tour ended, Berner began working in network radio in Hollywood, with recurring roles on Fibber McGee & Molly and The George Burns and Gracie Allen Show. On The Jack Benny Program, she voiced one-time parts before joining the principal cast as the recurring characters of Jack Benny's girlfriend Gladys Zybisco, and wisecracking telephone operator Mabel Flapsaddle, who gossiped about Benny with her cohort Gertrude Gearshift (Bea Benaderet), while Benny waited impatiently on the other end of the line for them to connect his call. Intended as a one-time appearance, they began recurring roles in the 1945–46 season, and in early 1947, Berner and Benaderet momentarily took over the actual NBC switchboards in Hollywood for publicity photos. Other radio work included waitress Dreamboat Mulvany on Arthur's Place; Mrs. Horowitz on Life with Luigi; Helen Wilson on Amos 'n' Andy; and an Italian housekeeper on The Jimmy Durante Show. She was cast alongside Rudy Vallée on his show The Fleischmann's Yeast Hour; however, she sued Vallée in 1945 for $19,500 in damages over claims he reneged on an "oral agreement" that he would hire her for 39 appearances on his show at $500 weekly.

As a result of her radio successes, Berner was given her own series on NBC, Sara's Private Caper, in which she starred as a police department stenographer who moonlighted as an amateur sleuth to solve crimes. Billed as "a satire on private detective stories" that claimed to feature Berner's actual voice, the show premiered on June 15, 1950 but was canceled after just eleven weeks, with its final broadcast on August 24. It had been hampered by multiple title changes prior to its debut, as well as confusion over whether to market the program as a mystery, comedy, or drama. Berner returned to supporting roles, but was temporarily removed from The Jack Benny Program for an eighteen-month period between 1954 and 1955 due to an undisclosed dispute with Benny, and was substituted by Shirley Mitchell as Mabel Flapsaddle in that duration.

Animation
Berner was active in vocal characterization for animated cartoons, working with several studios from the late 1930s through the 1940s. She was initially utilized for her imitations of Hollywood film actresses, such as Katharine Hepburn, Greta Garbo, Bette Davis, Joan Crawford, and Martha Raye. This led to her being cast in celebrity-ensemble shorts such as Disney's Mother Goose Goes Hollywood (1938) and The Autograph Hound (1939); Walter Lantz Productions' Hollywood Bowl (1938); and Warner Bros.' Hollywood Steps Out (1941).

Her mimicking of Hepburn led to her being hired by Lantz as the debut voice of Andy Panda, which she played only twice, in Life Begins for Andy Panda (1939) and Knock Knock (1940). Berner focused on voicing animals thereafter, with her work for Warner Bros. Cartoons (where she replaced Bernice Hansen) ranging from Mama Buzzard in Bugs Bunny Gets the Boid (1942) and The Bashful Buzzard (1945); to A. Flea in the short An Itch in Time (1943); and as part of an ensemble of voices in Book Revue (1946). For the Metro-Goldwyn-Mayer cartoon studio, Berner portrayed minor characters in the Tom and Jerry shorts Baby Puss and The Zoot Cat (both 1943), and The Mouse Comes to Dinner (1945). In the MGM live-action film Anchors Aweigh (1945), she voiced the otherwise-silent Jerry Mouse for the animated dance sequence with star Gene Kelly.

In August 1953, Berner provided the debut voice of another Walter Lantz character, the anthropomorphic penguin Chilly Willy. Though she received onscreen credit for her work, her duties consisted only of her singing the cartoon's opening theme, as the character himself was mute until his speaking voice was developed by Daws Butler in the 1960s.

Film and television

Berner filmed supporting roles in motion pictures from 1942 to 1957, including voicing a camel named Mabel in Road to Morocco (1942). During production, the film's casting director introduced her to Paramount Pictures executive Buddy DeSylva as "Mrs. Camel" instead of her actual name. DeSylva, who had to approve her voice for the character, addressed Berner by the title thereafter, which she disdained. In Alfred Hitchcock's Rear Window (1954), she and Frank Cady portrayed a married couple living in a Greenwich Village apartment complex shared by the film's temporarily immobile main character (played by James Stewart).

Aside from playing Mabel Flapsaddle in three episodes of The Jack Benny Program, Berner appeared on television mainly on variety shows and anthology series through the 1950s, and was the guest of honor on a December 10, 1952, episode of Ralph Edwards' reality series This Is Your Life. However, she worked little in the 1960s, aside from performing at the 1961 Grammy Awards in a comic-relief role alongside Mort Sahl, and appearing as a guest on Gypsy Rose Lee's daytime talk show in November 1966. Her final acting role was on an episode of CBS Playhouse that aired on January 29, 1967.

Personal life and death
In November 1950, Berner was photographed outside a mobile X-ray unit as part of an awareness campaign by the Los Angeles County X-ray Survey Foundation that encouraged screenings to help combat the spread of tuberculosis. She adhered to Judaism and was a Democrat who supported the campaign of Adlai Stevenson during the 1952 presidential election.

Berner married her theatrical agent, Milton Rosner, in Las Vegas, Nevada, on August 11, 1951; the couple had one daughter, Eugenie, whom they adopted two years later at eight months old. Rosner remained Berner's agent despite their separation in 1954, but she filed for divorce in May 1958, citing "extreme" verbal cruelty. Though she was awarded custody of their daughter, Berner was arrested in December 1959 on a misdemeanor charge of child endangerment.

Berner died at age 57 on December 19, 1969, and was interred at Mount Sinai Memorial Park Cemetery in Los Angeles, but her death was not made public until her family placed a memorial in the Van Nuys News in November 1970. She had been recovering from major surgery at a Culver City convalescent home two months before her death. Berner's personal property was sold at auction in Van Nuys in November 1971.

Acting style and reception
Berner's range of dialects included French, Spanish, Italian, Southern American, and New York English, which she learned by interacting with people who spoke in such accents. Her radio voice work gained unwelcome attention after a columnist described it as "being in bad taste". This in turn led to radio producers ordering her to not use foreign accents to get laughs, a ruling which Berner overturned: "I know I haven't offended anybody because in all the years I’ve been doing [accents] I’ve never, not even once, got a nasty letter." Eddie Cantor, with whom Berner first worked in the early 1930s on The Chase and Sanborn Hour, considered her then as "the greatest impersonator and dialectician of all time." Journalist Kay Gardella remarked in 1953 that interviewing Berner was "a Herculean feat" and "like trying to interview a trapeze artist while he's performing" due to Berner's switching to multiple dialects.

Selected filmography

Shorts

Warner Bros.
Confederate Honey (1940) (voice)
The Hardship of Miles Standish (1940) (voice)
The Henpecked Duck (1941) (voice)
The Daffy Duckaroo (1942) (voice)
The Hep Cat (1942) (voice)
Bugs Bunny Gets the Boid (1942) (voice)
An Itch in Time (1943) (voice)
Goldilocks and the Jivin' Bears (1944) (voices)
The Bashful Buzzard (1945) (voice)
Book Revue (1946) (voices)
Baby Bottleneck (1946) (voice)
Bacall to Arms (1946) (voice)
Hare Splitter (1948) (voice)

MGM
Baby Puss (1943) (voices)
Red Hot Riding Hood (1943) (voices)
The Zoot Cat (1944) (voice)
Swing Shift Cinderella (1945) (voice)
The Mouse Comes to Dinner (1945) (voice)
Lonesome Lenny (1946) (voice)
King-Size Canary (1947) (voice)

Walter Lantz Productions
Life Begins for Andy Panda (1939) (voice)
Knock Knock (1940) (voice)
Chilly Willy (1953) (voice, opening theme only)

Walt Disney Productions
Mother Goose Goes Hollywood (1938) (voices)
The Autograph Hound (1939) (voices)

Radio

Fibber McGee and Molly (1939)
The George Burns and Gracie Allen Show (1940-1949)
The Jack Benny Program (1940-1955)
Command Performance (1942-1948)
Lux Radio Theatre (1942-1948)
The Red Skelton Program (1944-1949)
Cavalcade of America (1944)
The Rudy Vallee Show (1945-1946)
The Baby Snooks Show (1946)
The Eddie Cantor Pabst Blue Ribbon Show (1947-1948)
Sara's Private Caper (1950)
Life with Luigi (1950-1952)
The Amos 'n' Andy Show (1950-1955)
The Jimmy Durante Show

Film

Television

References

External links

Sara Berner at RadioGOLDIndex
Sara's Private Caper at The Digital Deli Too

1912 births
1969 deaths
Actors from Albany, New York
Actresses from New York (state)
American film actresses
American radio actresses
Burials at Mount Sinai Memorial Park Cemetery
California Democrats
Jewish American actresses
Converts to Judaism
Metro-Goldwyn-Mayer cartoon studio people
New York (state) Democrats
Walter Lantz Productions people
Warner Bros. Cartoons voice actors
20th-century American actresses